Manor College is a private Catholic college in Jenkintown, Pennsylvania. It offers associate and bachelor's degrees and is best known for its veterinary technician and dental hygiene programs. To give students a hands-on learning experience, the college is home to both a Dental Health Center that serves the local community and a 50 acre farm and fully operational on-campus veterinary laboratories.

History

Manor College was founded in 1947  by the Byzantine Ukrainian Sisters of Saint Basil the Great. It is located in Jenkintown, Pennsylvania, a suburb of Philadelphia. In 1959, Manor College was chartered and incorporated in the Commonwealth of Pennsylvania. The college was approved by the State Council of Education Department of Instruction on June 17, 1964. The legal governing body of Manor College is the Board of Trustees, which is composed of twenty-one members, including lay men and women from the business and professional communities and religious Sisters of the Order of Saint Basil the Great.

In order to better reach affordability goals, the college froze tuition increases from 2016 to 2017. As a result, Manor College was listed in 2017 as the best-priced Catholic institution in Pennsylvania.

In 2018, Manor College announced that the institution would be offering bachelor's degree programs, beginning the fall 2018 semester. Branded as a "Soar in 4" campaign, the college successfully launched 15 new degree programs in fields such as healthcare management, criminal justice, business analytics, veterinary practice management, and more. In November of the same year, the college announced a partnership with Widener Law School that would allow students to combine their undergraduate pre-law degree with a law degree from Widener University Delaware Law School as part of an innovative "3+3" program. Students can also qualify for guaranteed admission to the law school.

Heritage
Manor College is related to the Ukrainian Catholic Church. Manor's objective to foster an awareness and appreciation of the Ukrainian heritage and culture is accomplished through its on-campus Ukrainian Heritage Studies Center which was established in 1977. The UHSC encompasses four major areas: Academic Studies, a Ukrainian Library, a museum collection of Ukrainian traditional arts and an Archives Division. Many Ukrainian immigrants looking for higher education in America attend Manor College as a method of easing their transition into American culture.

Adult Education

Manor College is home to the Civil War Institute, a historical program that allows participants to examine this period of American history from new perspectives. Participating instructors are experts in their respective fields, serving as members of the Delaware Valley Civil War Round Table. The school also offers a number of continuing educational programs for real estate, legal and more. In keeping with the school's Ukrainian roots, several classes in Ukrainian culture and language are offered every semester for children and adults alike.

Athletics
The Manor College intercollegiate athletics program offers a variety of non-competitive programs including basketball (men's and women's), soccer (men's and women's), baseball, and volleyball (women's). The teams are known as the "Blue Jays". Manor College's athletic teams compete in the National Junior College Athletic Association's 19th Region.

See also 
 Basil of Caesarea
 Ukrainian Greek Catholic Church

References

External links

 
Garden State Athletic Conference
Jenkintown, Pennsylvania
Educational institutions established in 1947
Universities and colleges in Montgomery County, Pennsylvania
1947 establishments in Pennsylvania
Catholic universities and colleges in Pennsylvania
Ukrainian Greek Catholic Church
Ukrainian Catholic Metropolia of Philadelphia
Ukrainian-American culture in Pennsylvania
Ukrainian-American culture in Philadelphia